Osler's nodes are painful, red, raised lesions found on the hands and feet. They are associated with a number of conditions, including infective endocarditis, and are caused by immune complex deposition. Their presence is one definition of Osler's sign.


Causes
Osler's nodes result from the deposition of immune complexes. The resulting inflammatory response leads to swelling, redness, and pain that characterize these lesions.

The nodes are commonly indicative of subacute bacterial endocarditis. 10–25% of endocarditis patients will have Osler's nodes. Other signs of endocarditis include Roth's spots and Janeway lesions. The latter, which also occur on the palms and soles, can be differentiated from Osler's nodes because they are non-tender.

Osler's nodes can also be seen in
 Systemic lupus erythematosus
 Marantic endocarditis
 Disseminated gonococcal infection
 Distal to infected arterial catheter

Etymology
Osler's nodes are named after Sir William Osler who described them in the early twentieth century. He described them as "ephemeral spots of a painful nodular erythema, chiefly in the skin of the hands and feet."

References

Symptoms and signs: Cardiac
William Osler